The 1929 Open Championship was the 64th Open Championship, held 8–10 May at Muirfield in Gullane, East Lothian, Scotland. Walter Hagen successfully defended his 1928 title, six strokes ahead of runner-up Johnny Farrell. It was Hagen's fourth win at the Open and his eleventh and final major title.

Qualifying was held 6–7 May, Monday and Tuesday, with 18 holes at Muirfield and 18 holes at the number 1 course Gullane, and the top 100 and ties qualified. Leo Diegel led the field with 144; the qualifying score was 162 and 109 players advanced.

Percy Alliss held the lead after the first round with a 69, while Leo Diegel matched that score in the second round to take the 36-hole lead. After a first-round 75, defending champion Hagen recorded an Open Championship record 67 in the second round on Thursday and was two back of Diegel. There was a change in the cut rule; players needed to be within fourteen strokes of the leader after 36 holes, but there was to be a minimum of sixty left in the field. The cut was at 157 (+17) and 64 advanced.

Windy conditions on Friday caused scores to soar over the final two rounds. Diegel shot 82 in the morning, with Alliss and Abe Mitchell at 76 and 78, respectively. Hagen finished with two rounds of 75 for 292. Diegel was a shot behind runner-up Farrell in third place, while Alliss and Mitchell shared fourth at 300.

Hagen, age 36, played the tournament just twice more, in 1933 and 1937, both following Ryder Cup matches in England. Six-time champion Harry Vardon, age 59, qualified for the Open for the final time and missed the cut by three strokes. Similar to 1928, this Open was played earlier than usual, in early May.

Course

Past champions in the field

Made the cut 

Source:

Missed the cut 

Source:

Did not advance past qualifying rounds (Monday & Tuesday):
James Braid (1901, 1905, 1906, 1908, 1910), 163.

Did not enter:
Bobby Jones (1926, 1927), Jock Hutchison (1921).

Round summaries

First round
Thursday, 8 May 1929

Source:

Second round
Thursday, 9 May 1929

Source:

Third round
Friday, 10 May 1929 (morning)

Source:

Final round
Friday, 10 May 1929 (afternoon)

Source:

Amateurs: Perkins (+32), MacKenzie (+33),  Tolley (+33), Von Elm (+38)

References

External links
Muirfield 1929 (Official site)

The Open Championship
Golf tournaments in Scotland
Open Championship
Open Championship
Open Championship